is a 2014 Japanese suspense film directed by Tetsuya Nakashima, starring Kōji Yakusho and Nana Komatsu. It was released on 4 July 2014, and is based on the novel  by Akio Fukamachi.

Plot
Akikazu Fujishima (Kōji Yakusho) is a former detective who lost his job, marriage and daughter after having a violent reaction to his wife's infidelity. Since then, he has become a dysfunctional, unstable alcoholic. Many years later, his ex-wife Kiriko (Asuka Kurosawa) contacts him to tell him that his daughter Kanako (Nana Komatsu) has gone missing. Akikazu begins investigating the disappearance, with police detective Asai (Satoshi Tsumabuki) ostensibly helping but in truth rarely involving himself in the search. Akikazu's methods involve harassing and intimidating those he speaks to, including Kanako's former classmates and teacher (Miki Nakatani), but none of them are forthcoming. Nonetheless, he discovers that she had become involved with drug users, and suspects that they made her into an addict.

Flashbacks to three years prior reveal how Sigon (Hiroya Shimizu) in Kanako's middle school had fallen in love with her, as she was the only kid who didn't bully or ostracize him. Sigon, knowing Kanako had been in love with a former student named Ogata, wanted her to feel the same way for him. This desire eventually leads him to attend a party with her, where he is drugged and raped. Sigon then tracks down Kanako and contemplates killing her, but is unable to. She embraces him, before an unidentified figure stabs Sigon in the neck, killing him.

In the present, Akikazu is eventually captured by the Yakuza, who torture and kill Kanako's gang member friend Matsunaga (Mahiro Takasugi) in front of him. Matsunaga informs Akikazu as to how Ogata was a "weak boy with a cute face" so they kidnapped him and allowed old men to rape him, which caused him to commit suicide. Kanako, having been in love with Ogata, befriended the group in order to exact revenge. Even knowing about Kanako's intentions and lack of feelings for anyone or anything, Matsunaga had fallen in love with Kanako and helped her to steal the photos. The Yakuza inform Akikazu that the police are also involved in the prostitution ring and that Detective Aikawa (Joe Odagiri) had killed several of Kanako's criminal friends in an attempt at a cover-up.  They provide Akikazu with a gun and send him to Aikawa's home.

Akikazu rapes Aikawa's wife, then takes her and her son hostage to meet Aikawa. The two have a bloody fight, during which Aikawa kills his wife, but both men survive.  The police, including Detective Asai, arrive on the scene, and kill Aikawa.  Akikazu hits Asai with his car and escapes.

Akikazu returns to the teacher that he questioned much earlier, having realized that her daughter was one of the children being raped in Kanako's photos, and that she had killed Kanako in revenge.  He forces her to dig up the grave that she buried Kanako in, but its location has been lost due to recent snowfall. While the teacher insists that his search for his daughter's body is futile and tries to escape, Akikazu continues to dig, refusing to acknowledge that his daughter is dead. The film ends as he vows to kill her himself.

Cast
 Kōji Yakusho as Akikazu Fujishima
 Nana Komatsu as Kanako Fujishima
 Satoshi Tsumabuki as Detective Asai
 Joe Odagiri as Detective Aikawa
 Fumi Nikaidō as Nami Endo (Kanako's ex-middle school classmate, Apocalypse Group member)
 Hiroya Shimizu as Sigon (Kanako's ex-middle school friend)
 Hiroki Nakajima as Shimatsu (Kanako's ex-middle school classmate, bully) 
 Ai Hashimoto as Emi Morishita (Kanako's high school friend)
 Asuka Kurosawa as Kiriko (Akikazu ex-wife, Kanako's mother)
 Miki Nakatani as Rie Azuma (Kanako's ex-homeroom teacher at middle school)
 Hitoshi Hoshino as Seiji Ogata (Kanako's ex-boyfriend from middle school)
 Mahiro Takasugi as Yasuhiro Matsunaga (Kanako's ex-middle school classmate, leader of Apocalypse Group)
 Jun Kunimura as Tsujimura (psychiatrist)
 Munetaka Aoki as Sakiyama (underboss of Ishimaru Gang)
 Aoi Morikawa as Tomoko Nagano (Kanako's high school friend)
 Yasuo Koh as Cho (capitalist)
 Megumi Hatachiya as Aikawa's Wife
 Daichi Watanabe as Hiroshi Kawamoto (Store Staff)
 Shouno Hayama as Blond Boy (Apocalypse Group member)

Music
 César Franck - "Panis angelicus"
 Antonín Dvořák - "Song to the Moon"
 Dempagumi.inc - "Den Den Passion"
 Trippple Nippples - "LSD"
 Daoko - "FOG"
 Fusanosuke Kondo - "I Love You, OK"
 Seiko Matsuda - "Sweet Memories"
 Dean Martin - "Everybody Loves Somebody"
 Mai Yamane - "House of the Rising Sun"

Reception
The film earned $1.1 million during its opening weekend, and debuted at No. 4 at the Japanese box office. It has grossed ¥377 million in Japan.

Mark Schilling of The Japan Times gave the film 3 out of 5 stars.

References

External links
 
 The World of Kanako media release

Japanese crime films
Films directed by Tetsuya Nakashima
2014 films
2010s Japanese films